{{Infobox film
| name = The Beloved Traitor
| image = A scene from "The Beloved Traitor" (SAYRE 13204).jpg
| image_size =
| caption = A scene from The Beloved Traitor' with Mae Marsh and E.K. Lincoln (page 14 of the March 2, 1918 Exhibitors Herald.
| director = William Worthington
| producer = Samuel Goldwyn
| writer = 
| narrator =
| starring = 
| music = 
| cinematography =George W. Hill
| editing = George Loane Tucker
| studio =Goldwyn Pictures
| distributor = Goldwyn Distributing
| released =  February 24, 1918
| runtime = 50 minutes
| country = United States
| language = 
| budget =
| gross =
}}The Beloved Traitor is a 1918 American silent drama film directed by William Worthington and starring Mae Marsh, E.K. Lincoln and Hedda Hopper. The film's sets were designed by the art director Hugo Ballin.

Cast
 Mae Marsh as Mary Garland 
 E.K. Lincoln as Judd Minot 
 Hedda Hopper as Myrna Bliss 
 George Fawcett as Henry Bliss 
 Bradley Barker as Paul Drayton 
 James A. Furey as Father Anthony
 Louis R. Grisel as Simeon Garland 
 Chester Morris as Dan

References

Bibliography
 Robert B. Connelly. The Silents: Silent Feature Films, 1910-36, Volume 40, Issue 2''. December Press, 1998.

External links
 
 

1918 films
1918 drama films
1910s English-language films
American silent feature films
Silent American drama films
American black-and-white films
Goldwyn Pictures films
Films directed by William Worthington
1910s American films